The  is a high-speed shinkansen train service operated by West Japan Railway Company (JR West) between  and  on the Hokuriku Shinkansen line in Japan. The shinkansen service was introduced on 14 March 2015, but the name was first used for a limited express overnight "Blue Train" sleeping car train service operated by Japanese National Railways (JNR) and later by JR West from 1961 until 1994. It was named after Mount Tsurugi.

Service outline

Rolling stock
 E7 series 12-car sets based at Nagano Depot, since 14 March 2015
 W7 series 12-car sets based at Hakusan Depot, since 14 March 2015

Tsurugi services are operated using JR East E7 series and JR West W7 series 12-car train sets based at Nagano and Hakusan depots respectively.

Formations
Tsurugi shinkansen services use 12-car JR East E7 series and JR West W7 series trainsets, formed as follows, with car 1 at the Toyama (eastern) end. Cars 1 to 7 are ordinary-class cars with 2+3 seating, car 11 is a "Green" car with 2+2 seating, and cars 8 to 10 and 12 are not available for passenger use. All cars are no-smoking.

History

Sleeping car Tsurugi

Regular Tsurugi services were discontinued from the start of the revised timetable on 4 December 1994.

Shinkansen Tsurugi
From 14 March 2015, the name Tsurugi was reinstated for use on all-stations shuttle services operating between Toyama and Kanazawa following the opening of the Hokuriku Shinkansen beyond Nagano.

See also
 List of named passenger trains of Japan

References

External links

 JR West Tsurugi train information 

Named passenger trains of Japan
West Japan Railway Company
Railway services introduced in 1961
Railway services discontinued in 1994
Railway services introduced in 2015
2015 establishments in Japan
Named Shinkansen trains